Kupinec  is a village in Croatia near Zagreb. It was first mentioned in 1550. Its church, the Church of the Assumption of the Blessed Virgin Mary was built in the 17th century.

People from Kupinec
 Vladko Maček, leader of the Croatian Peasant Party

References

Populated places in Zagreb County